The Falls of Kirkaig are a waterfall in the Northwest Highlands of Scotland in the county of Sutherland. The fall is located on the River Kirkaig, south by southeast of the village of Lochinver, on the main approach footpath to Suilven mountain. About four miles across the hills to the west is Fionn Loch.

See also
Waterfalls of Scotland

References

Waterfalls of Scotland